John Alexander Miller McNutt (1914–1992) was Dean of Clogher from 1982 until 1984.
 
He qualified from Edgehill Theological College, Belfast (a Methodist institution) in 1937; and was ordained into the Church of Ireland a decade later. He began his Anglican ministry with a curacy at Drummullan. He was Rector of Trory from 1957 to 1973; Rural Dean of Enniskillen from 1959 to 1965; Chaplain to the Bishop of Clogher from 1965 to 1973; Rural Dean of Kilskeery from 1967 to 1973; Rector of Magheracross from 1973 to 1984; Prebendary of Clogher Cathedral from 1973 to 1980; and its Chancellor from 1980 to 1984.

References

1914 births
Converts to Anglicanism from Methodism
Irish Anglicans
Alumni of Edgehill Theological College
Deans of Clogher
1992 deaths
20th-century Irish Anglican priests